Barakot is a ward (ward number 10) in Dasharathchanda municipality, in Baitadi District in Sudurpashchim Province of western Nepal. Earlier it was a village development committee (VDC). At the time of the 1991 Nepal census it had a population of 2,389 and had 462 houses in the village.

The ward consist of villages Harsau, Guinada, Salaani, Chauda, Jhaka, Barakot, and Bhatala with Bhatala being the largest village with over 50 households. Majority of the dwellers are Hindu Rajputs (Bisht), known as Hadasai Bisht Dynasty, Egarya Bisht (11 son) family is well known in Pithoragarh district Uttarakhand and Baitadi/Dadeldhura/darchula district of Nepal . Other casts include Brahmins (Bhatt), Rajputs (Chand, Budal) and some deprived classes (Dalits—Damayee, Chunara etc.).
There is a temple in Barakot named Nagarjun Daneswar temple in Satpali in the bank side of river Mahakali.
There is a 10+2 school—Shree Daneshwar Higher Secondary School at Barakot. Barakot also has a primary level school at Bhatala named Shree Gyaneshwar Primary School.

References

Populated places in Baitadi District